Mehdi Mohammed Zeyo (c. 1962 – 20 February 2011) was a Libyan middle manager for a state oil company in Benghazi, Libya. In the wake of the Libyan Civil War, Zeyo found he could no longer bury the civilian youth killed by Muammar Gaddafi's forces; he subsequently decided to use his car to blow up the gates to a military base in Benghazi. This allowed the civilian oppositional fighters to overrun the base and claim Benghazi as an oppositional stronghold in the Libyan Civil War.

Background
NPR reporter Lourdes Garcia-Navarro describes Zeyo as "the most unlikely hero of the Libyan Civil War." As an older gentleman of 49 amongst the youth democracy protesters, the middle-manager for a state oil company joined the peaceful protest movement as soon as it began.

References

External links

1962 births
2011 deaths
People from Benghazi
People of the First Libyan Civil War